Willyaroo is a former village now on the southeastern outskirts of Strathalbyn in the Australian state of South Australia. It is crossed by the River Angas.

The name Willyaroo is believed to be an Aboriginal name meaning to invoke a good harvest. The area was known as New Hamburg until the name was changed in 1916.

References

Towns in South Australia